Kevin David Wortman (February 22, 1969 – April 11, 2018) was an American hockey player.

After spending three seasons at American International College (1988–1991), Wortman began his professional hockey career with the Calgary Flames' affiliate team in the IHL, the Salt Lake Golden Eagles. The recipient of the Ken McKenzie Trophy for Outstanding American-Born Rookie in 1991–92, Wortman finished fourth in team scoring during his rookie year.

Even with a successful rookie season in the IHL, Wortman was still back with Salt Lake for the 1992–93 season, once again finishing fourth in team scoring with 63 points and being selected to the IHL Second All-Star Team.

Although he spent the better part of the 1993–94 season leading the AHL's Saint John Flames defensemen in scoring, Wortman made his NHL debut during the '93–'94 season, playing in five games with Calgary, while registering no points.

In the summer of 1994, Wortman signed as a free agent with the San Jose Sharks where he joined their IHL affiliate, the Kansas City Blades, for the 1994–95 season. Spending only one season in Kansas City, Wortman joined the Fort Wayne Komets in 1995–96 before heading to Finland for the next three years and to Germany for the 1999–2000 season.

Awards
1991–92: Ken McKenzie Trophy for Outstanding American-Born Rookie in the International Hockey League
1992–93: IHL Second All-Star Team

Personal life
Wortman was born to Susan and Frederick Wortman in Saugus, Massachusetts and is one of 6 children. He attended Saugus High School, before going to American International College where he played hockey. He died on April 11, 2018, in Saugus, Massachusetts.
He was the father of Alycia Wortman of Saugus and former husband of Ellen Jo (Wiswall) Wortman.

References

External links

1969 births
2018 deaths
American men's ice hockey defensemen
American International Yellow Jackets men's ice hockey players
Calgary Flames draft picks
Calgary Flames players
Essen Mosquitoes players
Fort Wayne Komets players
Ice hockey players from Massachusetts
JYP Jyväskylä players
Kansas City Blades players
People from Saugus, Massachusetts
Saint John Flames players
Salt Lake Golden Eagles (IHL) players
Schwenninger Wild Wings players
Sportspeople from Essex County, Massachusetts
Vienna Capitals players